A cavalier is a fortification which is built within a larger fortification, and which is higher than the rest of the work. It usually consists of a raised platform within a fort or bastion, so as to be able to fire over the main parapet without interfering with the fire of the latter. Through the use of cavaliers, a greater volume of fire can be obtained, but its great height also makes it an easy target for a besieger's guns.

There are two types of cavaliers:
Common cavalier – a raised gun platform without any additional defensive features
Defensible cavalier – a raised gun platform surrounded by a ditch. If the ditch cuts across the bastion's terreplein and is supported by cuts, the cavalier can also be considered as a retrenchment.

Gallery

References

Fortification (architectural elements)